is a song by Japanese singer songwriter Mai Kuraki, taken from her fourth compilation album Mai Kuraki x Meitantei Conan Collaboration Best 21: Shinjitsu wa Itsumo Uta ni Aru! (2017). It was released on April 12, 2017 on physical format and April 19, 2017 on digital format by Northern Music and served as the theme song to the 2017 Japanese animated film Detective Conan: Crimson Love Letter. "Togetsukyo (Kimi Omou)" is a Gagaku-inspired ballad.  The song was written by Kuraki herself and her long-time collaborator Akihito Tokunaga. The song was later included on Kuraki's twelfth studio album Kimi Omou: Shunkashūtō.

The song has become Kuraki's most successful single since her 2004 single "Ashita e Kakeru Hashi", peaking at number two in the Billboard Japan Hot 100 and five in the Oricon Singles Chart, selling over 76,000 physical copies and downloaded over 250,000 times.

Critical reception
"Togetsukyo (Kimi Omou)" received mostly positive reviews from critics. CD Journal noted that the arrangement of the song reflects Kuraki's elegant and the taste of Japan. Also, the website acclaimed her voice as innocent and mellowed.

Commercial performance
"Togetsukyo (Kimi Omou)" debuted at number 5 on the Oricon Weekly Singles Chart, selling 29,846 physical copies. It became her first single in the last 8 years to sell over 29,000 physical copies in its first week. The song also entered Japan Hot 100 chart at number nine and peaked at number two after released on digital format.

In September, 2017, the song received Platinum certification by Recording Industry Association of Japan
 (RIAJ), selling over 250,000 single units.

On May 10, 2017, the song debuted at number 8 on the Oricon Monthly Singles Chart, selling over 48,000 physical copies and became Kuraki's best-selling single in 2010's. The song has spent 41 weeks on the chart and it became Kuraki's longest charting song surpassing her biggest hit song "Love, Day After Tomorrow", which charted for 30 weeks.

The song is named "the best-selling physical single by female solo singer in 2017".

Music video
A short version of the official music video was first released on Kuraki's official YouTube account on 13 March 2017, about a month before the song was released. It features Kuraki wearing Jūnihitoe, a kind of traditional Japanese garment. As of August 2022, it has received over 12.54 million views on YouTube. A full version of the video is included in the DVD accompanies limited edition of the single.

In popular culture
"Togetsukyo (Kimi Omou)" was served as the theme song to the 2017 Japanese animated film Detective Conan: Crimson Love Letter and later used as the ending song to the animation Detective Conan.

On December 31, 2017, Kuraki sang the song on the Japanese national music TV program 68th NHK Kōhaku Uta Gassen.

Track listing

Charts

Weekly charts

Monthly charts

Year-end charts

Certification and sales

|-
! scope="row"| Japan (RIAJ)
| 
| 76,305 
|-
! scope="row"| Japan (RIAJ)
| Platinum
| 250,000 
|-
|}

Release history

References

2017 singles
2017 songs
Mai Kuraki songs
Pop ballads
Case Closed songs
Songs written by Mai Kuraki
Songs with music by Akihito Tokunaga
Songs written for films
Song recordings produced by Daiko Nagato